The Lone Defender is a 1930 American Pre-Code Mascot serial film starring Rin Tin Tin. It was Mascot's first all-sound serial (the second to have any sound at all, after the partial sound in The King of the Kongo). It was Rin Tin Tin's first serial at Mascot, after being dropped by Warner Bros. when they decided animal pictures would not work with "Talkies".  He also starred in the later serial The Lightning Warrior, which was his last appearance (he died in 1932).

The plot revolves around Rin Tin Tin as "Rinty" and a secret gold mine fought over by the criminal "The Cactus Kid" and the legitimate owners. Material from this serial was edited into a feature film version and released under the same name in 1934.

Plot
Prospector Juan Valdez is murdered by The Cactus Kid and his gang in an attempt to discover the location of his gold mine.  Valdez's dog Rinty witnesses the murder and can also lead the gang to the mine, making him the villain's target throughout the serial.  In addition Rinty must help Valdez's daughter Dolores legitimately find and claim the mine while being blamed for being the wolf that has been attacking local livestock.

The mysterious figure of Ramon is constantly on hand, overhearing pieces of the villain's conversations.  He appears to be another bandit but his actions seem to contradict that. It is revealed in the finale of the serial that Ramon is in fact "Marco Roberto", an agent of the Justice Department.

Cast
Rin Tin Tin as "Rinty", Juan Valdez's dog
Josef Swickard as Juan Valdez, Prospector who owns a secret gold mine
June Marlowe as Dolores Valdez, Juan Valdez's daughter
Walter Miller as Marco Roberto, Justice Department Agent posing as the "Mysterious Figure", Ramon
Buzz Barton as Buzz, Ramon's sidekick
Lee Shumway as Amos Harkey, the villainous cantina owner
Julia Bejarano as Maria, the Dueña
Lafe McKee as Sheriff Billings
Arthur Morrison as Limpy
Frank Lanning as Burke, Prospector and Juan Valdez's partner
Bob Kortman as Jenkins, one of the Cactus Kid's Henchmen
Victor Metzetti as Red, one of the Cactus Kid's Henchmen
Otto Metzetti as Red's Partner

Production

Stunts
Joe Bonomo
Kermit Maynard
Arthur Metzetti
Victor Metzetti

Chapter titles
 Mystery of the Desert
 The Fugitive
 Jaws of Peril
 Trapped
 Circle of Death
 Surrounded by the Law
 The Ghost Speaks
 The Brink of Destruction
 The Avalanche
 Fury of the Desert
 Cornered
 Vindicated
Source:

See also
List of film serials by year
List of film serials by studio

References

External links

The Lone Defender article on a June Marlowe fansite

1930 films
1930 Western (genre) films
American black-and-white films
1930s English-language films
Films about dogs
Mascot Pictures film serials
Films directed by Richard Thorpe
American Western (genre) films
Films produced by Nat Levine
Rin Tin Tin
Films with screenplays by Harry L. Fraser
1930s American films